Naveira is a surname. Notable people with the surname include:

Gustavo Naveira (born 1960), Argentine tango dancer and dance teacher 
Miriam Naveira (born 1934), Puerto Rican jurist 
Miriam Rodón Naveira, Puerto Rican environmental scientist
Roberto Naveira (born 1970), Spanish judoka